Florida River is a  tributary of the Animas River in La Plata County, Colorado.

The river's source is Lillie Lake in the Weminuche Wilderness.  After being impounded by the Lemon Dam to form Lemon Reservoir about fifteen miles northeast of Durango, it joins the Animas River south of Durango on the Southern Ute Indian Reservation near the New Mexico state line.

Florida is a name derived from Spanish meaning "little flower".

See also
List of rivers of Colorado

References

Rivers of Colorado
Rivers of La Plata County, Colorado
Tributaries of the Colorado River in Colorado